Margaret Lee Mui Lin (born 24 May 1970) is a former Singaporean actress. Lee was a Mediacorp full-time artiste from 1990 to 2000 and from 2003 to 2009.

Career
Lee entered the entertainment industry after placing second to Chew Chor Meng in the Star Search Competition held in year 1990. Lee first appeared in an episode of the Singapore comedy serial Modern Romance as a vampish model. In 1992, she played a kind and caring nurse in Breaking Point, alongside critically acclaimed stars Li Nanxing and Huang Biren. In 1995, she starred in the television film To Madam With Love. In the following year, she starred in the television film The Night is Young.

Lee then left the entertainment industry for 3 years before returning to local TV in 2003. Her most notable role was in the drama Holland V, where she played as an irresponsible mother who leaves her daughter in the care of the Mo family. She has also starred in a number of local movies, such as The Best Bet (2004) and I Do, I Do (2005) which were directed by Jack Neo. She has also starred in a local sitcom series: Police & Thief. In July 2004, Lee appeared on the cover of FHM Singapore.

Personal life
Lee was born in Hougang and is Catholic. She speaks the Teochew dialect and attended CHIJ St Joseph's Convent.

Filmography

Film

Television

References

External links

1970 births
Living people
Singaporean people of Chinese descent
Singaporean television actresses